was a daimyō of Odawara Domain in Sagami Province (modern-day Kanagawa Prefecture) in early-Edo period Japan. His courtesy title was Mino no Kami.

Biography
Inaba Masanori was the second son of the previous daimyō  of Odawara, Inaba Masakatsu. As his mother died when he was still very young, he was raised by his grandmother, Kasuga no Tsubone, the wet nurse to shōgun Tokugawa Iemitsu. On the death of his father  in 1634, he became head of the Inaba clan, and inherited his father's position as daimyō of Odawara. Due to the influence of his grandmother, he rose rapidly through the hierarchy of the Tokugawa shogunate and was appointed Rōjū under Shogun Tokugawa Ietsuna on December 8, 1681. On May 27, 1683, he retired from public life, turning his domain over to his son, Inaba Masamichi.

References
 Papinot, Edmond. (1906) Dictionnaire d'histoire et de géographie du japon. Tokyo: Librarie Sansaisha...Click link for digitized 1906 Nobiliaire du japon (2003)
 Sadler, A. L. (2009). The Life of Tokugawa Ieyasu. Olympia Press. .

Masanori
1623 births
1696 deaths
Fudai daimyo
Rōjū